Lahontan State Recreation Area is a public recreation area surrounding Lake Lahontan, a  impoundment of the Carson River, located approximately  west of Fallon, Nevada. Much of the park lies below  in elevation and is dominated by high desert sagebrush. Wooded areas of native cottonwoods and willow trees can be found along the shore of the lake. Primary access points to the park are along U.S. Route 50 near the Lahontan Dam and off U.S. Route 95 in the town of Silver Springs. A corridor known as Carson River Ranches connects Lahontan with Fort Churchill State Historic Park.

History
Following passage of the Newlands Reclamation Act of 1902, the Lahontan Dam was constructed along the Carson River between Fallon and Carson City. The reservoir was named after ancient Lake Lahontan which covered much of Nevada during the last ice age. Submerged beneath the water were parts of stagecoach routes which existed during the 1800s including Williams Station, the scene of the Battle of Williams Station, a minor skirmish during the Paiute War. Originally operated by Churchill and Lyon counties, Lahontan became a state-operated recreation area in 1971.

Activities and amenities
Park activities include boating, water skiing, fishing and camping. The park has two developed picnicking areas as well as a developed campground at Silver Springs Beach #7. Primitive camping is allowed in most other areas. Multiple trails can be found along the length of the reservoir.

References

External links

Lahontan State Recreation Area Nevada State Parks

State parks of Nevada
Protected areas of Churchill County, Nevada
Protected areas of Lyon County, Nevada
Protected areas established in 1971
1971 establishments in Nevada